The Children's Book of the Year Award: Picture Book has been presented occasionally since 1955 by the Children's Book Council of Australia (CBCA).

The Award "will be made to outstanding books of the Picture Book genre in which the author and illustrator achieve artistic and literary unity, or, in wordless picture books, where the story, theme or concept is unified through illustrations."

Award winners

See also

 List of CBCA Awards
 List of Australian literary awards

References

External links
 CBCA Awards History

Awards established in 1955
Children's Book Council of Australia
Picture book awards
1955 establishments in Australia
English-language literary awards